X-Sat is a microsatellite developed and built by the Nanyang Technological University (NTU) in collaboration with Defence Science Organisation (DSO) Singapore. The satellite was launched by ISRO's PSLV-C16 on 20 April 2011 from Satish Dhawan Space Centre FLP in Sriharikota, India. The satellite was launched along with Indian ResourceSat-2 and Indo-Russian YouthSat.

References

External links

NSSDC ID: 2011-015C
Homepage
A few photographs of the development process
Academic paper discussing the design of the X-Sat PPU
The X-Sat PPU: designed to be the first Beowulf cluster in space

Mini satellites of India
Spacecraft launched in 2011
2011 in India